The 2017 CBR Brave season was the Brave's 4th season in the Australian Ice Hockey League since being founded and entering the league in 2014. The season ran from 22 April 2017 to 3 September 2017 for the Brave. CBR finished third in the regular season behind the Melbourne Ice and Perth Thunder. The Brave qualified for the AIHL Finals in Melbourne and played in semi-final two. Canberra defeated the Thunder 6–2 to qualify for the Goodall Cup Final for the second time in franchise history. The Brave were defeated in the final by the Ice 1–4, Canberra's second championship final loss in a row.

News

Canberra appointed a new head coach, Rob Starke, in January 2017 ahead of the 2017 AIHL season. The appointment was the Starke's first coaching role since his retirement from playing in 2016. 

The day after the end of the season, Brave all-time leading point scorer, Stephen Blunden, announced his departure from the team and return to Canada.

Roster

Team roster for the 2017 AIHL season

Transfers

All the player transfers in and out by the CBR Brave for the 2017 AIHL season.

In

Out

Staff

Staff Roster for 2017 AIHL season

Standings

Regular season

Summary

Position by round

League table

Source

Finals

Summary

Bracket

Schedule & results

Regular season

Finals
Goodall Cup semi-final

Goodall Cup final

Player statistics

Skaters

Goaltenders

Awards

References

CBR Brave seasons